Płock Land was a land (administrative division) of the Kingdom of Poland until 1495, and later, part of the Płock Voivodeship, Crown of the Kingdom of Poland, Polish–Lithuanian Commonwealth, from 1495 to 25 September 1793. The seat of its government was located in Płock.

Subdivisions 
The land was divided into five counties. They were:
 Płock County (seat: Płock);
 Bielsk County (seat: Bielsk);
 Raciąż County (seat: Raciąż);
 Płońsk County (seat: Płońsk);
 Sierpc County (seat: Sierpc).

Sierpc County was formed in the 1530s, from the portion of the Bielsk County.

Notes

References 

History of Masovia
Płock
States and territories disestablished in 1793
1793 disestablishments in the Polish–Lithuanian Commonwealth
Ziemias